Red Before Black is the fourteenth studio album by American death metal band Cannibal Corpse, released on November 3, 2017. This is the band's final album to feature guitarist Pat O'Brien before producer Erik Rutan officially replaced him in 2021.

Background 

The band started to write the album in 2016 after the last run of touring for their previous album, A Skeletal Domain. When interviewed in 2017 drummer Paul Mazurkiewicz stated that the band never go by any specific blueprints when they start writing for an album, pointing out that this was also the case with Red Before Black. However the idea of utilizing some slower doom elements was discussed beforehand. This manifested in a couple of songs, while they mostly remained true to their death metal sound and thrash metal roots.

Mazurkiewicz came up with the album title while sleeping in the middle of the night, making him wake up. Further down the road of creating the album he said about the title "... I really pushed for it because I felt it was very strong and something very different than our previous titles. It’s simple, but effective".

After hearing the song 'Only One Will Die', penned by bassist Alex Webster, all members of the band thought it should be the first track of the album. The first song they worked on was 'Red Before Black'. It started out as an unnamed piece written by guitarist Pat O'Brien with Mazurkiewicz contributing with a title and the lyrics later.

Choosing to work with Erik Rutan as a producer again after working with Mark Lewis on the previous album was partly because of convenience, enabling the band to stay focused during the recording process, although Rutan's previous work with the band was also a deciding factor.

Track listing

Credits 
Writing, performance and production credits are adapted from the album liner notes.

Personnel

Cannibal Corpse 
 George "Corpsegrinder" Fisher – vocals
 Pat O'Brien – lead guitar
 Rob Barrett – rhythm guitar
 Alex Webster – bass
 Paul Mazurkiewicz – drums

Guest musicians 
 Erik Rutan – backing vocals on "Only One Will Die" and guitar solo on "In the Midst of Ruin"

Production 
 Erik Rutan – production, engineering, mixing
 Art Paiz – assistant engineering
 Alan Douches – mastering

Visual art 
 Vince Locke – cover art  
 Brian Ames – layout
 Alex Morgan – photography

Studios 
 Mana Recording Studios, St. Petersburg, FL, United States – engineering, mixing
 West West Side Music, Cornwall, NY, United States – mastering

Charts

References

External links
 

2017 albums
Albums produced by Erik Rutan
Cannibal Corpse albums
Metal Blade Records albums